This is a list of shopping centres in the Urban agglomeration of Longueuil, in the Montérégie region of Quebec.

Boucherville

Carrefour de la Rive-Sud
Carrefour de la Rive-Sud is a power centre inaugurated in 2002 in Boucherville, Quebec at the corner of highways 20 and 30.

The major tenants are IKEA,  Costco, Rona le Rénovateur, Super C, Winners, Homesense, Marshalls, Bureau en Gros, Deco Decouverte, and Linen Chest. Other tenants include Sports Experts, Tommy Hilfiger, Bouclair, L'Equipeur and Archambault. Among popular boutiques, there is Reitmans, BCBG Maxazria, Aldo and Garage. Although Carrefour de la Rive-Sud does occupy a large territory, its number of tenants is no more than 60.

Carrefour de la Rive Sud houses one of the three Adidas warehouse stores in Quebec that sells the Adidas Performance collection, Adidas' sub-brand which specializes in sport clothes and running shoes.

With Quartier DIX30 in Brossard, Carrefour de la Rive Sud represent the major unenclosed malls of Greater Longueuil, although smaller power centers can be found in the cities of Longueuil and Saint-Bruno.

Promenades Montarville
Promenades Montarville is one of the smallest indoor malls in Greater Longueuil. It is situated at the corner of de Montarville and de Mortagne boulevards in the city of Boucherville.

The majors tenants are Provigo, Canadian Tire, Go Sport and Jean Coutu. Many of the tenants are small business, but the mall also has a number of retailing chains such as Dollarama, La Source, Greiche & Scaff, Ardène, Le Naturiste and Panda. The bank in the mall is Banque de Montreal (BMO) and its restaurants are Tim Hortons and Subway.

It was opened on October 24, 1979, by Provigo, developed at the cost of $6 million.  It inaugurated with 37 stores and was the first shopping centre to be wholly-owned by Provigo. The anchors were Provigain and Canadian Tire. There was also a Sears catalogue centre and a SAQ.

Promenades Montarville is less than 5 km (3 miles) away from the much larger (but not enclosed) Carrefour de le Rive-Sud.

Brossard

Champlain Mall

Place Portobello

Place Portobello is a shopping mall located in Brossard, Quebec along Taschereau Boulevard near the Autoroute 10-Taschereau Interchange. It has 504,000 square feet of gross leasable on a land of 40 acres. There is a building in the middle of the mall with second and third floors serving as commercial office spaces.Some major tenants include Linen Chest, Maxi and Jean Coutu. There is a nearby Réno-Dépot hardware store which is a tenant of Place Portobello despite not sharing any indoor or outdoor boundary with the rest of the mall. Since March 2011, Place Portobello is operated by First Capital Realty. Place Portobello was previously operated by Cogir Management Corporation. Although it no longer owns or manages the mall, Cogir is still has its offices in the building of Place Portobello.

It inaugurated on September 21, 1966, with Woolco, Dominion and 20 stores. It expanded with the opening of new anchor Beaver Lumber on May 1, 1974, and the addition of new stores in 1975.

Dominion  became Provigo on June 22, 1981.

Following the acquisition of the eight Quebec Beaver Lumber locations by Groupe Val Royal Ltd,  the Portobello store closed on December 24, 1987, was given a facelift and reopened in early February 1988 as a Brico Centre outlet.

In 1991, Provigo rebranded to Maxi. It was the second supermarket to carry the Maxi banner in Greater Longueuil after that retailer's first location opened in 1984 in Longueuil proper.

Walmart bought the Woolco stores in 1994. The Woolco sign that hung for 27 years at the Place Portobello store came down on March 1, 1994, and was replaced by Walmart's. Walmart left the mall in January 2008 to relocate to a larger stand alone building in Quartier DIX30. It was replaced by Zellers from December 2008 to December 2012. The Zellers was renovated and converted into a Target store, which opened its doors to the public on September 17, 2013, which later closed in 2015. The former Target is now subdivided between a Renaissance thrift store, a Buffet des Continents buffet restaurant, a Surplus RD furniture outlet, a Party Mania location, a Canada Computers shop and a World Gym fitness center.

Quartier DIX30

Longueuil

Greenfield Park

5000 Taschereau
5000 Taschereau is a shopping mall located in the borough of Greenfield Park, Quebec, Canada located on Taschereau Boulevard, near Greenfield Park's borough limit with neighbouring Brossard. It inaugurated around the same time as its original tenant Super Carnaval which opened on January 23, 1985.  From the late 1980s and up until 2010, the mall was called Mail Carnaval and was named after Super Carnaval (today Super C).

Mail Carnaval was once an indoor shopping centre. A Jean Coutu pharmacy was one of the first tenants in the 1980s, but soon moved out. Beginning in December 1988, Mail Carnaval featured a mini indoor attraction park open every week-ends in the heart of the mall. Tenants that once made business at Mail Carnaval include a Do it Center hardware store, American fitness chain Gold's Gym, a Famous Players movie theatre, the National Bank of Canada and a Zellers department store. For a number of years and up until 2009, Mail Carnaval was the headquarters of fitness chain Nautilus Plus which was located right next to the branch of competitor Énergie i.e. Cardio. However, Nautilus Plus never operated an actual branch in the mall.

As of 2002, Mail Carnaval gradually began losing its small tenants and was on its way to become a dead mall. In the summer of 2007, the last small tenants left the mall. The mall's indoor corridor was demolished in 2009. Shortly after Zellers closed in May 2010, the name of the mall was changed from Mail Carnaval to 5000 Taschereau.  As of 2021, only Super C, Énergie Cardio, Michaels as well as relocated L'Équipeur and Winners stores from nearby Place Greenfield Park are in operation at 5000 Taschereau. Due to the demolition of the indoor mall section in 2009, Super C's building is physically separated from the rest of the tenants.

Galeries Taschereau

Galeries Taschereau is a strip mall that was an enclosed mall until 2002. Previously managed by Cambridge Leaseholds, it is now operated by Sandalwood Management. The mall served as the city council of the city of Greenfield Park until the late 1990s.

The major tenants are Fruiterie 440, Hart, L'Aubainerie,  Marché du Store, and warehouses of both Pennington and Taylor. Joining them are two are restaurants (Amir and Subway), a Buzzfit Gym as well as a few smaller enterprises including a hairdresser (P&J Coiffure), a cellular phone repair enterprise (UBreakIFix), and a marijuana market selling [pot-culture] paraphernalia

Galeries Taschereau was anchored at its opening in late 1973 by A&P Canada, Greenberg and Horizon. In early 1979, Eaton's changed the vocation of the Horizon location by turning it into a Foyerama furniture store. An expansion in 1983 increased the size of the mall to 220 000 square feet and tripled its number of tenants to 60 anchors and shops including a new Zellers store which replaced the Eaton's (Foyerama) store. It was a significantly smaller than contemporary Zellers stores and it closed in 1987. Hart, Le Château warehouse occupy and a recently vacated  Village des Valeurs occupy the space where this Zellers stood. It had no connection to the Zellers store that later opened in 1990 at Mail Carnaval.

In February 2020, Village des Valeurs left its location at Galeries Tachereau it had occupied since 1991, to relocate to other side the street on Auguste Avenue. Other past tenants of mall include Provigo (which replaced A&P in 1984 and is now the Fruiterie 440), Future Shop, Bouclair and Bank of Montreal.

Place Greenfield Park

Place Greenfield Park (also called Riocan Greenfield Park) is a large strip mall located in Greenfield Park, Quebec. It is located on Taschereau Boulevard, extending from Gladstone Street to Margaret Street. It is owned and operated by RioCan. Place Greenfield was once an enclosed shopping centre but was converted to the strip format in 2001. For 40 years, the shopping centre was under the management of Ivanhoe Corporation (today Ivanhoé Cambridge). In September 2002, Ivanhoé Cambridge sold the mall to RioCan.

It started in 1962 with only a Steinberg's supermarket and a Woodward Steinberg (Miracle Mart) department store.  A Pascal hardware store was added in the first half of 1964. The mall itself and its shops opened in 1965 with, among others, anchor tenant Wise.

Toyville, a large-sized toy retailer, inaugurated on October 22, 1981. The store was located on the end side of the shopping center that intersects Gladstone Avenue. Its space was later occupied by a Club Biz office supply store from October 29, 1992, until that chain filed for bankruptcy protection and closed in early 1996. Like the rest of Club Biz locations, the lease was acquired by Bureau en Gros which inaugurated its store on June 1, 1996, a few days after opening its door to the public.

Leon's opened a store on January 6, 1988. It replaced the Miracle Mart store that had closed in 1986. In October 2007, Leon's left its location in the mall and moved to the intersection of Chambly Road and Autoroute 30 in the St-Hubert borough of Longueuil. After being for much of the 2010s either a Ha Bay furniture store or later Le Grand Marché Rive-Sud flea market, the space was subdivided in 2017 by Jysk, Univers Kids Dépôt and a portion of Giant Tiger. Jysk opened on June 3, 2017. 

Pascal's at Place Greenfield Park closed in late July 1991, outliving by a few weeks most of the chain's other locations. Along with the stores at Place Versailles and Quebec City, it was one of the three final Pascal's locations to close which concluded the history of the 87-year-old hardware chain. Goineau-Bousquet, a hardware retailer from Laval announced in late 1991 that it would set up a 100,000 square foot store in the former Pascal's site in Greenfield Park. Goineau-Bousquet filed for bankruptcy protection on June 3, 1996, and, in the process, announced the closing of its Greenfield Park location, effective for the end of July. In 1998, Cinémas Guzzo took the space to open what was, at the time, the biggest movie theater in Quebec history.

In mid-1992, the Steinberg grocery store rebranded as Provigo which in turn was converted to Maxi within the year.

Winners opened a store of 25,000 square feet on August 17, 1995. It replaced the majority of the Wise store which had closed only months before.

Saint-Hubert

Centre Cousineau

Centre Cousineau (also called Centre Cousineau Point-Zero since 2010) is located at the intersection of Cousineau Blvd and Montée Saint-Hubert.  It is managed and owned by Enterprises Point-Zéro, a company best known for its clothing lineup Point-Zéro. The major anchor tenants are Jean Coutu, Metro Plus and Le SuperClub Vidéotron. From 1997 to 2010, the mall housed the public library of Saint-Hubert.

Centre Cousineau has its origins in the 1960s as a nameless strip mall that corresponds today to the section of the mall that faces Montée Saint-Hubert. In 1978, the strip mall was converted into the current indoor mall. It was first named Galeries Cousineau in 1978, then renamed Complexe Cousineau in 1987, and finally Centre Cousineau in 2006.

The mall was at its peak in the 1980s, with a total of 75 stores including anchors Rona, Greenberg, Sports Experts, Croteau, Jean Coutu and Metro. Its office building was home to a CLSC and many Saint-Hubert municipal services.
 
Centre Cousineau began to lose ground in the 1990s. By the mid-2000s, it had all but been turned into a dead mall, with retailing chains such as La Source, Société des alcools du Québec and Petland having closed in addition to the many small businesses. To add to the injury, a fire in 2007 destroyed La Crémière, a fast food and ice cream store, and the Jean-Coutu pharmacy, causing the permanent closure of the former and relocation of the latter. Lack of proper insurance coverage caused the mall to be partially barricaded for a number of years without renovation.

In 2009, Entreprises Point-Zéro acquired Centre Cousineau. It made significant improvements to the anchor stores, including renovating extensively their exterior facades. The rest of the centre however continued to be deserted. As of late September 2018, the few indoors tenants that were left relocated to the outdoor section on Montée Saint-Hubert. The mall's doors have all been permanently locked with the lights turned off. Only its three anchor stores on Cousineau Blvd. and a handful of small tenants on the strip mall section facing Montée Saint-Hubert survive.

Le Vieux-Longueuil

Centre Jacques-Cartier
Centre Jacques-Cartier is a small shopping mall located in Le Vieux-Longueuil borough of Longueuil, Quebec. The mall is made of approximately 45 stores occupying  square feet of rentable space. It is located at the intersection of Chambly Road and Ste-Foy Boulevard

Its original anchors in 1957 were Steinberg's, Wise, Woolworth's and United Stores. These companies are gone today but their anchor spaces have remained more or less the same and are currently occupied respectively by IGA, Rossy, Dollarama and Village des Valeurs. Other current major tenants include Cinémas Guzzo and Pharmaprix.

Since its opening on August 23, 1957, Centre Jacques-Cartier has been the oldest shopping centre in the South Shore of Montreal. The mall is named after Ville Jacques-Cartier which was the name of the city at the time the shopping centre was constructed. It was originally known simply as the Ville Jacques-Cartier shopping centre. After the municipality of Jacques-Cartier was dissolved, the mall took on the name of Place Jacques-Cartier throughout the 1970s and 1980s. It was renamed to its current moniker in the mid-1990s, presumably to avoid confusion with the attraction of the same name. It went from being a strip mall to an enclosed shopping centre circa 1970.

Like other early shopping centres in Quebec, it was developed by Ivanhoe, the real estate company of Sam Steinberg. Successor Ivanhoé Cambridge owned the mall until September 2002. After this, the mall was managed by RioCan which co-owned it with another company . It is now owned and operated by Toronto-based Strathallen Capital.

Place Desormeaux

Place Desormeaux is a shopping mall located in Longueuil, Quebec, Canada at the corner of Chambly Road and Desormeaux Blvd. Its major tenants are Super C and Walmart. The mall is made of approximately 45 stores occupying  of rentable space.  The mall has two banks: Bank of Montreal and National Bank of Canada.

The mall officially inaugurated on May 25, 1971 though its stores had gradually began opening their doors since May 19th. It opened with 50 commerces and two large department stores,   Zellers and Bonimart, each occupying an area of 100,000 square feet. The shopping mall as a whole was 300,000 square feet and was owned by Marcel Adams. At its opening, Place Desormeaux was the largest mall in the South Shore as well as the fourth in the Montreal area after Fairview Pointe-Claire, Galeries d'Anjou and Place Versailles. Tenants in the 1970s included Steinberg's, the Bank of Montreal, Banque Canadienne Nationale, Reitmans, J B Lefebvre and Laura Secord Chocolates.

Place Desormeaux began a renovation project in spring 1986 which was completed in the fall within the same year. A notable consequence of this renovation was the reduction of the size of the Bonimart store whose remaining anchor space was converted into a mall section for 15 to 20 new shops. This increased Place Desormeaux's number of tenants to 70 even if its total area remained the same.

In April 1991, Zellers announced the rebranding into its nameplate of 46 Towers/Bonimart stores. Since there was already a Zellers store in the mall, the Bonimart at Place Desormeaux was closed. Its closing greatly decreased consumer traffic in the section of the mall it was located to the point that by the mid-1990s there was not a single shop left around where used to be Bonimart. In 1997, that part of Place Desormeaux was demolished and rebuilt with a complete new design to welcome the current Super C.

The Steinberg grocery chain went bankrupt in 1992. Unlike most Steinberg locations, the one at Place Desormeaux was not sold and was closed outright instead. A small grocery chain Esposito took over the lease. Esposito in turn closed in 1996, opening the way for department store Winners to install itself in the mall on August 22, 1996. After operating for some 10 years, Winners closed around late 2006/early 2007. The space is now home to a branch of the SAAQ and the Longueuil Local Employment Centre, both of which are part of the Government of Quebec.

After 40 years in operation, Zellers permanently closed its doors in June 2012. Walmart assumed the lease of the former Zellers store and opened its store in October of the same year.

Place Longueuil

Place Longueuil is a shopping mall located in Longueuil, Quebec, Canada. The major stores are IGA Extra, Winners/HomeSense and, to a lesser extent, St-Hubert and Sports Experts.

Place Longueuil opened on November 2, 1966. It inaugurated with 50 stores including Steinberg, Miracle Mart and the Royal Bank of Canada.

Place Longueuil and its 60 shops were destroyed on October 6, 1979, by a major fire. The damage was estimated at 15 million $ and more than 20,000 people watched the shopping mall burned. It took five fire departments to extinguish the blaze and three firemen were briefly injured. Unlike the shops, Steinberg's and Miracle Mart were spared due to the presence of fire sprinkler systems in their stores.

The mall was rebuilt and reopened on April 8, 1981, with 90 stores.

Miracle Mart was renamed M in 1986 and the chain finally went under in 1992. After M closed, Zellers took the location of M and remained there until its own closure in 2012 and its subsequent replacement by Target the following year. 

In February 2011, it was announced that Homburg Canada would succeed over Cogir as manager of Place Longueuil. The transaction took effect a couple of days later. As of 2017, Place Longueuil was owned and operated by Cominar. In early 2022,  acquired 25% of Cominar's portfolio including Place Longueuil.

Saint-Bruno-de-Montarville

Promenades Saint-Bruno

Saint-Lambert

Carré Saint-Lambert

Carré Saint-Lambert is a small strip mall located on Sir Wilfrid Laurier Boulevard near Victoria Avenue in St. Lambert, Quebec, Canada. The property is owned and operated by SGI Properties, a Quebec-based real estate company. Built in 1958, it is located just off the Victoria Bridge and near the Lemoyne  neighbourhood of Longueuil.

Its major tenants include IGA, Familiprix, Le SuperClub Vidéotron, Société des alcools du Québec.

Former tenants include headquarters of the Riverside School Board.

See also
 List of malls in Montreal
 List of small shopping centres in Montreal

References

External links
Official website Carrefour de la Rive-Sud
Official website Centre Jacques-Cartier 
Official website (current) Place Desormeaux 
Official website (former) Place Desormeaux 
Official website Galeries Taschereau
Official website Place Longueuil 
Official website Promenades Montarville
Official website Place Portobello

Buildings and structures in Longueuil

Tourist attractions in Montérégie
Shopping malls in Longueuil
Lists of shopping malls